Chah Gaz (also Romanized as Chāh Gaz) is a village in Howmeh Rural District, in the Central District of Kahnuj County, Kerman Province, Iran. At the 2006 census, its population was 761, in 155 families.

References 

Populated places in Kahnuj County